The German men's national inline hockey team is the national team for Germany. Most recently, the team won the bronze medal at the 2007 Men's World Inline Hockey Championships. The current head coach is Georg Holzmann.

2008 World Championship team
The following players were named to the 2008 German national inline hockey team.

References

Inline hockey in Germany
National inline hockey teams
Inline hockey
Men's sport in Germany